Guzelce or Güzelce may refer to:

 Güzelce Ali Pasha (died 1621),  Ottoman statesman
 Güzelce Dam, a dam in Turkey
 Asuman Güzelce (born 1969), Turkish writer and art teacher
 Güzelce, Bayburt, a village in Bayburt Province, Turkey